Manslaughter is a 2005 Danish drama film written and directed by Per Fly. The film stars Jesper Christensen, Beate Bille and Pernilla August as well as Fly's wife Charlotte Fich.

Manslaughter won the Nordic Council Film Prize in 2005, multiple awards at the 2006 Bodil Awards — including Best Actor, Best Film and Best Supporting actress — as well as being nominated for several other major film awards. Beate Bille also received a Shooting Star Award at the 2006 Berlin International Film Festival for her role in the film.

The film is part of a trilogy by Fly about the Danish society. Bænken is about the underclass, Arven about the upper class and Manslaughter about the middle class.

Cast
 Jesper Christensen
 Pernilla August
 Beate Bille
 Charlotte Fich
 Michael Moritzen
 Henrik Larsen
 Bodil Sangill
 Kurt Dreyer
 Mads Keiser
 Birgitte Prins
 John Martinus

References

External links
 

2005 films
2005 drama films
2000s Danish-language films
Danish drama films
Films directed by Per Fly
Nordisk Film films